Santa Reparata International School of Art (SRISA) is an art college situated in the center of Florence, Italy in Via San Gallo. The school is attended by international students, mostly American, who are pursuing a semester, year or summer program abroad. The courses are taught in English and may be taken for university credit through Maryville University. Santa Reparata has been a part of Florence's artistic life for more than 40 years and thrives on an interchange of culture and ideas.

The school offers programs of study during both Spring and Fall semesters, along with three sessions in the Summer. All courses are taught by locally and internationally recognized instructors within the extensive facilities at Santa Reparata. Courses and Programs include: Photography, Printmaking, Book Arts, Painting, Drawing, Fashion Design, Italian Language, Graphic Design, Digital Imaging, Video, Interior Design/ Architecture, Art History, History, Humanities, Sociology, Creative Writing, plus many more.

Located in the historic center of Florence, SRISA was founded in 1970 by artists Dennis Olsen and Meredith Dean. The artistic ambiance of Santa Reparata is enhanced by its location in a 19th-century building, once home to the famous Libreria Le Monnier. With over 7,000 square feet, the facilities include extensive printmaking, photography, and painting studios along with lecture rooms, computer lab, library and a contemporary art gallery space visible from the street.

References

External links 
 

Education in Florence
Art schools in Italy